Placidus Gervasius Nkalanga, OSB (19 June 1919 – 18 December 2015) was a Tanzanian Prelate of the Roman Catholic Church. He was a monk of the St Maurus & St Placidus Hanga Abbey in Hanga, Ruvuma Region, Tanzania, a Benedictine monastery of the Congregation of Missionary Benedictines of Saint Ottilien. He lived there for 42 years, from his resignation from the bishopry in 1973 until his death in 2015.

Biography
Born in Ruti, Tanganyika, Nkalanga was ordained a priest on 15 July 1950. He was consecrated on 21 May 1961 by Pope John XXIII after being appointed Auxiliary Bishop of Bukoba and Titular Bishop of Balbura on 18 April 1961. The new bishop attended the Second Vatican Council from 1962 to 1965, missing only Session Two running from 29 September 1963 to 4 December 1963. Between February 1966 and 29 May 1969 he served as the first Apostolic Administrator of the Roman Catholic Diocese of Kabale in Western Uganda after it was just established in the Ecclesiastical province of Mbarara. In Uganda he was revered notably for his evangelical simplicity and persuasive personality which made him an ideal leader.

On 6 March 1969 Nkalangwa was appointed Bishop of the Diocese of Bukoba, serving as President of the Episcopal Conference of Tanzania from 1969 to 1970. His appointment followed the promotion of the late Cardinal Laurean Rugambwa to Archbishop of Dar-es-Salaam.  He remained in this position until his resignation on 26 November 1973 when he joined the Monastic Order of Saint Benedict in Hanga, Songea. On 28 December 2015 Nkalanga died in Peramiho, Songea, a Benedictine abbey in Southwestern Tanzania. At the time of his death he was the oldest living Catholic bishop in Africa and 18th oldest in the world.

References

External links
Catholic-Hierarchy

1919 births
2015 deaths
Participants in the Second Vatican Council
20th-century Roman Catholic bishops in Tanzania
Benedictine bishops
Tanzanian Benedictines
Roman Catholic bishops of Bukoba